The following outline is provided as an overview of and topical guide to nuclear power:

Nuclear power – the use of sustained nuclear fission to generate heat and electricity. Nuclear power plants provide about 6% of the world's energy and 13–14% of the world's electricity, with the U.S., France, and Japan together accounting for about 50% of nuclear generated electricity.

What type of thing is nuclear power? 

Nuclear power can be described as all of the following:

 Nuclear technology (outline) – technology that involves the reactions of atomic nuclei. Among the notable nuclear technologies are nuclear power, nuclear medicine, and nuclear weapons. It has found applications from smoke detectors to nuclear reactors, and from gun sights to nuclear weapons.
 Electricity generation – the process of generating electric energy from other forms of energy. The fundamental principles of electricity generation were discovered during the 1820s and early 1830s by the British scientist Michael Faraday.  His basic method is still used today: electricity is generated by the movement of a loop of wire, or disc of copper between the poles of a magnet.

Science of nuclear power 
 Nuclear engineering
 Nuclear chemistry
 Nuclear fission
 Nuclear physics
 Atomic nucleus
 Ionizing radiation
 Nuclear fission
 Radiation
 Radioactivity
 Radioisotope thermoelectric generator
 Steam generator (nuclear power)

Nuclear material 

Nuclear material
 Nuclear fuel
 Fertile material
 Thorium
 Uranium
 Enriched uranium
 Depleted uranium
 Plutonium
 Deuterium
 Tritium

Nuclear reactor technology 
 Nuclear reactor technology
 Types of nuclear reactors
 Advanced gas-cooled reactor
 Boiling water reactor
 Fast breeder reactor
 Fast neutron reactor
 Gas-cooled fast reactor
 Generation IV reactor
 Integral Fast Reactor
 Lead-cooled fast reactor
 Liquid-metal-cooled reactor
 Magnox reactor
 Molten salt reactor
 Pebble bed reactor
 Pressurized water reactor
 Sodium-cooled fast reactor
 Supercritical water reactor
 Very high temperature reactor

Dangers of nuclear power 
 Lists of nuclear disasters and radioactive incidents
 Nuclear reactor accidents in the United States
 Radioactive waste
 Nuclear proliferation 
 Nuclear terrorism
 Radioactive contamination

Notable accidents
2011 Japanese nuclear accidents
1986 List of Chernobyl-related articles
1985 Soviet submarine K-431
1979 Three Mile Island accident
1968 Soviet submarine K-27
1961 Soviet submarine K-19

History of nuclear power 

History of nuclear power
 Atomic Energy Commission (disambiguation)
 History of uranium
 Lists of nuclear disasters and radioactive incidents
 United Nations Atomic Energy Commission (1946-1948)
 United States Atomic Energy Commission (1946-1974)
 Nuclear renaissance

Nuclear power industry 
 Environmental impact of nuclear power
 Nuclear renaissance
 Relative cost of electricity generated by different sources

Uranium mining 
 Uranium mining debate
 Nuclear power plant

Uranium processing 
 Isotope separation
 Enriched uranium
 Nuclear reprocessing
 Reprocessed uranium

Nuclear power plants 
 Economics of new nuclear power plants
 Nuclear power plant emergency response team
 List of nuclear reactors
 Reactor building

Specific nuclear power plants 
 List of nuclear power stations
 List of cancelled nuclear plants in the United States
 Baltic nuclear power plant (disambiguation)
 Belarusian nuclear power plant project
 Berkeley nuclear power station
 Bradwell nuclear power station
 Chapelcross nuclear power station
 Dodewaard nuclear power plant
 Heysham nuclear power station
 Hinkley Point A nuclear power station
 Hinkley Point C nuclear power station
 Hunterston A nuclear power station
 Hunterston B nuclear power station
 Russian floating nuclear power station
 Sizewell nuclear power stations
 Trawsfynydd nuclear power station

Nuclear waste 
 High-level radioactive waste management
 List of nuclear waste treatment technologies

Nuclear power by region 
 Nuclear power by country
 List of nuclear power accidents by country
 Nuclear power in Asia
 Nuclear power in India
 India's three stage nuclear power programme
 Nuclear power in Indonesia
 Nuclear power in Japan
 Nuclear power in North Korea
 Nuclear power in Pakistan
 Nuclear power in South Korea
 Nuclear power in Taiwan
 Nuclear power in Thailand
 Nuclear power in the People's Republic of China
 Nuclear power in the Philippines
 Nuclear power in the United Arab Emirates
 Nuclear power in Australia
 Nuclear power in Europe
 Nuclear power in the European Union
 Nuclear power in Albania
 Nuclear power in Belarus
 Nuclear power in Bulgaria
 Nuclear power in the Czech Republic
 Nuclear power in Finland
 Nuclear power in France
 Nuclear power in Germany
 Nuclear power in Italy
 Nuclear power in Romania
 Nuclear power in Russia
 Nuclear power in Scotland
 Nuclear power in Spain
 Nuclear power in Sweden
 Nuclear power in Switzerland
 Nuclear power in Ukraine
 Nuclear power in the United Kingdom
 Nuclear power in North America
 Nuclear power in Canada
 Nuclear power in the United States
 Nuclear power plants in New Jersey

Nuclear power companies 
 Companies in the nuclear sector – list of all large companies which are active along the nuclear chain, from uranium mining, processing and enrichment, to the actual operating of nuclear power plant and waste processing.
 BKW FMB Energie AG
 ČEZ Group
 China Guangdong Nuclear Power Group
 China National Nuclear Corporation
 China Nuclear International Uranium Corporation
 E.ON
 E.ON Kernkraft GmbH
 E.ON Sverige
 Electrabel
 Électricité de France
 Eletronuclear
 Endesa (Spain)
 Energoatom
 Fennovoima
 Fortum
 Iberdrola
 Korea Hydro & Nuclear Power
 Bhavini
 Nuclear Power Corporation of India
 Nuclearelectrica
 OKB Gidropress
 Resun
 Rosenergoatom
 RWE
 Unión Fenosa
 Teollisuuden Voima
 Vattenfall
 Vattenfall Europe Nuclear Energy GmbH

Nuclear safety 
 Nuclear safety
 Event tree
 Event tree analysis
 Exclusion area
 International Nuclear Safety Center
 Nuclear power plant emergency response team
 Reactor protection system
 Nuclear safety in the United States

Nuclear power in space 
 Nuclear power in space
 Advanced Stirling Radioisotope Generator

Politics of nuclear power 
 Alsos Digital Library for Nuclear Issues
 Anti-nuclear movement
 Anti-nuclear movement in Germany
 Anti-nuclear movement in the United States
 Anti-nuclear power movement in Japan
 Anti-nuclear protests
 Anti-nuclear protests in the United States
 Nuclear energy policy
 Nuclear power debate
 Nuclear power phase-out
 Nuclear power proposed as renewable energy
 Nuclear whistleblowers
 Nuclear renaissance
 Uranium mining debate

Politics of nuclear power by region 
 1978 Austrian nuclear power referendum
 2008 Lithuanian nuclear power referendum
 1980 Swedish nuclear power referendum

Nuclear regulatory agencies 
 Association Nationale des Comités et Commissions Locales d'Information (France)
 Atomic Energy Regulatory Board (India)
 Autorité de sûreté nucléaire (France)
 Bangladesh Atomic Energy Commission
 Brazilian–Argentine Agency for Accounting and Control of Nuclear Materials
 Canadian Nuclear Safety Commission
 International Nuclear Regulators' Association
 Japanese Atomic Energy Commission
 Japanese Nuclear Safety Commission
 Nuclear and Industrial Safety Agency (Japan, retired)
 Nuclear Regulation Authority (Japan)
 Kernfysische dienst (The Netherlands)
 Nuclear Regulatory Commission (USA)
 Pakistan Nuclear Regulatory Authority
 Säteilyturvakeskus (Finland)

Nuclear power organizations
 See also Nuclear regulatory agencies, above

 Alsos Digital Library for Nuclear Issues
 International Nuclear Safety Center

Against

 Friends of the Earth International, a network of environmental organizations in 77 countries.
 Greenpeace International, a non-governmental environmental organization with offices in 41 countries.
Nuclear Information and Resource Service (International)
World Information Service on Energy (International)
Sortir du nucléaire (France)
Pembina Institute (Canada)
Institute for Energy and Environmental Research (United States)
Sayonara Nuclear Power Plants (Japan)

Supportive

Nuclear power groups
 World Nuclear Association, a confederation of companies connected with nuclear power production. (International)
 International Atomic Energy Agency (IAEA)
 Nuclear Energy Institute (United States)
 American Nuclear Society (United States)
 United Kingdom Atomic Energy Authority (United Kingdom)
 EURATOM (Europe)
 Atomic Energy of Canada Limited (Canada)
 Environmentalists for Nuclear Energy (International)

Nuclear power publications 

 Nuclear Power and the Environment
 Reaction Time: Climate Change and the Nuclear Option
 World Nuclear Industry Status Report
 In Mortal Hands

Persons influential in nuclear power 
Scientists
Enrico Fermi – an American physicist
James Chadwick
Politicians
Harry Truman
Ed Markey
 Naoto Kan
 Nobuto Hosaka
 Angela Merkel
Engineers
David Lochbaum
Arnold Gundersen
George Galatis

See also 
 Fusion power
 Future energy development
 German nuclear energy project
 Inertial fusion power plant
 Linear no-threshold model
 Polywell
 World energy resources and consumption

References

External links 

 Nuclear Energy Institute – Beneficial Uses of Radiation
 Nuclear Technology
Reactor Power Plant Technology Education – Includes the PC-based BWR reactor simulation.
 Alsos Digital Library for Nuclear Issues – Annotated Bibliography on Nuclear Power
 An entry to nuclear power through an educational discussion of reactors
 Argonne National Laboratory – Maps of Nuclear Power Reactors
 Briefing Papers from the Australian EnergyScience Coalition
 British Energy – Understanding Nuclear Energy / Nuclear Power
 Coal Combustion: Nuclear Resource or Danger?
  
 Energy Information Administration provides lots of statistics and information
 How Nuclear Power Works
 IAEA Website The International Atomic Energy Agency
 IAEA's Power Reactor Information System (PRIS)
 Nuclear Power: Climate Fix or Folly? (2009)
 Nuclear Power Education 
 Nuclear Tourist.com, nuclear power information
 Nuclear Waste Disposal Resources
 The World Nuclear Industry Status Reports website
 Wilson Quarterly – Nuclear Power: Both Sides
 TED Talk – Bill Gates on energy: Innovating to zero!
 LFTR in 5 Minutes – Creative Commons Film Compares PWR to Th-MSR/LFTR Nuclear Power.

!
Nuclear power
Nuclear power